Gloria Borders is a sound effects editor, best known for Terminator 2: Judgment Day for which she won an Oscar as well for Best Sound Editing. She was also the General Manager for Skywalker Sound.

Borders attended Moorestown Friends School.

Oscar history
Both film were for Best Sound Editing.

1991 Academy Awards-Terminator 2: Judgment Day. Award shared with Gary Rydstrom. Won.
1994 Academy Awards-Forrest Gump. Nomination shared with Randy Thom. Lost to Speed.

Selected filmography

TRON: Legacy (2010) (visual effects executive producer) 
Titan A.E. (2000) (Skywalker post-production liaison)
Forrest Gump (1994) (supervising sound editor) 
Mrs. Doubtfire (1993) (supervising sound editor)
Terminator 2: Judgment Day (1991)
Driving Miss Daisy (1989)
Tucker: The Man and His Dream (1988)
Ewoks: The Battle for Endor (1985)
The Ewok Adventure (1984)
Indiana Jones and the Temple of Doom (1984)
Return of the Jedi (1983)
The Right Stuff (1983) (stock footage researcher)

References

External links
 

American sound editors
Living people
Best Sound Editing Academy Award winners
Moorestown Friends School alumni
Year of birth missing (living people)
Women sound editors